Andrew Charles Spencer Peacock  FBA is a British historian and author. He specializes in the histories of the Seljuk Empire and Ottoman Empire.

Life 

He was born and raised in Hampshire, England. He completed his PhD in Oriental Studies at the University of Cambridge.

Career 

He is currently a professor of history at the University of St. Andrews. Peacock is a fellow of the Society of Antiquaries of London and a Fellow of the British Academy.

Bibliography 
His books include:
Mediaeval Islamic Historiography and Political Legitimacy: Bal'ami's Tarikhnamah; Routledge (2007)
The Frontiers of the Ottoman World (ed.); Oxford University Press for the British Academy (2009)
Early Seljuq History: A New Interpretation; Routledge (2010)
The Seljuks of Anatolia: Court and Society in the Medieval Middle East (ed. with Sara Nur Yıldız); I.B. Tauris (2013)
The Great Seljuk Empire; The Edinburgh History of the Islamic Empires, Edinburgh University Press (2015)
Islam and Christianity in Medieval Anatolia (ed. with Bruno De Nicola and Sara Nur Yıldız); Ashgate Publishing (2015)
Medieval Central Asia and the Persianate World: Iranian Tradition and Islamic Civilisation (ed. with D. G. Tor); I.B. Tauris (2015)
Court and Cosmos: The Great Age of the Seljuqs (with Sheila R. Canby, Deniz Beyazit, and Martina Rugiadi); Metropolitan Museum of Art (2016)

References

External links
 University of St. Andrews 
 Edinburgh University Press 

English historians
Living people
Year of birth missing (living people)
Scholars of Ottoman history
Academics of the University of St Andrews
English orientalists